Mikhail Osipovich Rushchinsky (born 17 January 1895 in Moscow; died 22 March 1942 in Moscow) was a Soviet football player and manager.

Honours
 RSFSR champion: 1920, 1928.
 USSR champion: 1920, 1928.

International career
Rushchinsky made his debut for USSR on 16 November 1924 in a friendly against Turkey.

External links
  Profile

1895 births
1942 deaths
Russian footballers
Soviet footballers
Soviet Union international footballers
Soviet football managers
PFC CSKA Moscow managers
Association football defenders
FC Torpedo Moscow players